Mullen is a surname of Irish and Scottish origin. Notable people with the surname include:

Alex Mullen (born 1992), Australian professional footballer 
Andrew Mullen (born 1996), British Paralympian swimmer
Ann A. Mullen (1935–1994), American politician
April Mullen, Canadian actress and filmmaker
Barbara Mullen (1914–1979), American actress
Brian Mullen (born 1962), former NHL player
  Charles Mullen, Irish immigrant to South Australia who invented the mullenising agricultural method in the 1860s
Charlie Mullen (1889–1963), Major League Baseball first baseman
Conor Mullen (born 1962), Irish actor 
Dan Mullen (born 1972), American college football coach
Danny Mullen (born 1995), Scottish professional footballer
David Mullen (photographer) (born 1952), artist and photographer
David Mullen (singer) (born 1964), former Blues Pop / CCM singer and producer
Earl Mullen (1902–1969), American politician and businessman
Ed Mullen (1913–1988), American professional basketball player
Frank Mullen, American death metal vocalist
Fraser Mullen (born 1993), professional footballer
Geoff Mullen (1947–2014), Australian draft resister
  (born 1974), art historian, gallery owner and auctioneer in Berlin
Graham Calder Mullen (born 1940), Senior United States District Judge
Harryette Mullen (born 1953), American poet, author and professor of English
James T. Mullen (1843–1891), first Supreme Knight of the Knights of Columbus
Jarrod Mullen (born 1987), current NRL player
Jeff Mullen (born c. 1968), assistant football coach for West Virginia University
Jerry Mullen (1933–1979), college basketball player (San Francisco)
Jim Mullen (born 1945), Scottish jazz guitarist
Jimmy Mullen (footballer born 1923) (1923–1987), football player
Jimmy Mullen (footballer born 1952) (born 1952), former football player and manager
Joe Mullen (born 1957), former NHL player
John Joseph Mullen (1829–1897), member of the Queensland Legislative Council
John Mullan (academic), professor of English at University College London
Karl Mullen (1926–2009), Irish Rugby Union player 
Kathryn Mullen (born 1940), American puppeteer, actress, and voice actress
Keith Mullen (born 1961), English rock musician
Larry Mullen, Jr., (born 1961), drummer for U2
Laura Mullen (born 1958), American poet 
Luke Mullen (born 2001), American actor, filmmaker, and environmentalist
M. David Mullen (born 1962), Japanese-born American cinematographer
Madeleine ffrench-Mullen (1880–1944), Irish revolutionary and labour activist
Marie Mullen (born 1953), Irish actress
Mark Mullen (born 1961), NBC News Chief and Reporter
Matthew Mullen (born 1989), Australian footballer 
Michael Mullen (1919–1982), Irish Labour Party politician and trade union official
Michael Mullen (born 1946), United States Navy admiral and Chairman of the Joint Chiefs of Staff for the US military
Michael Mullen (born 1958), professional investment analyst and associate professor of finance at Stonehill College
Moon Mullen (1917–2013), American baseball player
Nick Mullen (born 1988), American comedian
Nicole C. Mullen (born 1967), American singer, songwriter, and choreographer
Patrick Mullen (ice hockey) (born 1986), American ice hockey player
Patrick Mullen (Medal of Honor) (1844–1897), member of the United States Navy
Paul Mullen (rugby union) (born 1991), Irish-born rugby union player
Paul Mullen (born 1982), English multi-instrumentalist and singer-songwriter
Peg Mullen (1917–2009), American anti-war activist
Peter Mullen (born 1942), British Church of England priest and Rector of St Michael, Cornhill
Rodney Mullen (born 1966), professional skateboarder
Rónán Mullen (born 1970), Irish politician
Ruth González Mullen (1939–2009), Cuban artist
Ryan Grice-Mullen (born 1986), former gridiron football wide receiver
Ryan Mullen (born 1994), Irish professional racing cyclist
Samuel Mullen (1828–1890), Irish bookseller in Australia
Sheila Mullen (artist) (born 1942), Scottish painter
Sheila Mullen (model) (born 1957), American model
Thomas Mullen (1897–1966), Irish Fianna Fáil politician and school teacher
Tiawan Mullen (born 2000), American football player
Tobias Mullen (1818–1900), Roman Catholic Bishop of Erie
Tom Mullen (born 1951), American football player
Trayvon Mullen (born 1997), American football player
William F. Mullen, III, United States Marine Corps officer
Len Mullen, Glasgow Scotland, Professional Boxer

See also
Mac Maoláin, a surname
Maelan mac Cathmogha, a king
Moylan, a surname
Mullenising, an Australian scrub-clearing device
Mullens (disambiguation)
Mullin, a surname
Mullins (surname)

English-language surnames
Surnames of Irish origin
Anglicised Irish-language surnames